The Östergötlands Fotbollförbund (Östergötland Football Association) is one of the 24 district organisations of the Swedish Football Association. It administers lower tier football in Östergötland County.

Background 

Östergötlands Fotbollförbund, commonly referred to as Östergötlands FF, is the governing body for football in the county of Östergötland. The Association currently has 156 member clubs.  Based in Linköping, the Association's Chairman is Gillis Persson.

Affiliated Members 

The following clubs are affiliated to the Östergötlands FF:

AC Studenterna
Assyriska Föreningen i Norrköping
Azech Syrianska Föreningen
Babel FF
Bjälbo IF
Bjärka-Säby GoIF
Björsäters SK
BK Derby
BK Derby Ungdom
BK Hird
BK Kenty
BK Linköping
BK Ljungsbro
BK Tinnis
BK Vingen
BK Zeros
Boets IK
Borens IK
Borensbergs IF FK
Borggårds IK
Borghamns IF
Boxholms IF
Bråvalla IK
Brokinds IF
Chile Unido IF
Club de Futsal Xeneizes
Dagsbergs IF
Degerön-Godegårds IF
Ekängens IF
Eneby BK
Fågelsta AIF
Falerums IF
FC Linköping United
FC Norrköping
FC Syrianska Linköping
FC Vasastan
FF Jaguar
Finspångs AIK
Finspångs FK
FK Linköping
Fornåsa IF
Gammalkils IF
Grebo IK
Grytgöls IK
Gusums IF
Hagahöjdens BK
Hageby IF
Hägerstads IF
Hannäs IF
Hästholmens IF
Hävla SK
Hemgårdarnas BK
Hjulsbro IK
Horn-Hycklinge IF
IBall FC
IF Kneippen
IF Sylvia
IF Trym
IFK Motala FK
IFK Norrköping DFK
IFK Norrköping FK
IFK Wreta Kloster
Igelfors IF
IK Klockaretorpet
IK Österviking
IK Östria Lambohov
IK Sjöge
IK Sleipner
IK Waria
IKF Bosna i Hercegovina Linköping
Karle IF
Kättinge IF
KFUM Trix
Kimstad GoIF
Kisa BK
Kisa United BK
Klockrike AIF
Kristbergs IF
Krokeks IF
Kuddby IF
Kurdiska FF Linköping
Kvarsebo IK
Lambohovs FF
LBK Gottfridsberg
Ledbergs IF
Lindö FC
Lindö FF
Linghems SK
Linköping Kenty DFF
Linköping Universitets Akademiska IF FK
Linköpings FC
Linköpings FF Ungdom
Ljusfallshammar SK
Loddby IF
Lotorps IF
LSW IF
Malexanders IF
Malmens FF
Malmslätts AIK
Mantorps FF
Medevi IF
Mjölby AI FF
Mjölby AI UF
Mjölby SK
Mjölby Södra IF
Mjölby Turabdin FC
Motala AIF FK
Normlösa IF
Norrköping City DFF
Norrköping Futsal Klubb
Norrköpings FF
Norrköpings IF Bosna
Norsholms IF
Reijmyre IF
Rimforsa IF
Ringarums IF
Rök-Svanshals IK
S:t Kuryakos IF
Saltängens BK
Simonstorps IF
Skärblacka IF
Skarphagens IK
Skeninge IK
Slätmons BK
Smedby AIS
Söderköpings IK
Södra IF Linköping
Sonstorps IK
Stegeborgs IF
Stjärnorps SK
Strålsnäs FF
Sturefors IF
Svärtinge SK
Syrianska KF i Norrköping
Tallboda IF
Tannefors IF
Tjällmo IF
Torstorps IF
Väderstads IK
Vadstena GIF
Valdemarsviks IF
Vallerstads IF
Vånga IF
Västerlösa GoIF
Västra Caféet BK
Västra Harg IF
Västra Husby IF
Vidingsjö MoIF
Vikingstads SK
Åbackarna BK
Åby IF
Åtvidabergs FF
Åtvidabergs Södra IK
Ödeshögs IK
Örtomta GoIS
Österstads IF
Östra Ryds IF

League Competitions 
Östergötlands FF run the following League Competitions:

Men's Football
Division 4  -  two sections
Division 5  -  three sections
Division 6  -  four sections

Women's Football
Division 3  -  one section
Division 4  -  two section
Division 5  -  two sections

Footnotes

External links 
 Östergötlands FF Official Website 

Ostergotlands
Football in Östergötland County